The Cheaters is a 1930 Australian silent film directed by Paulette McDonagh and starring Isabel McDonagh (professionally known as Marie Lorraine). Phyllis McDonagh worked as art director. The McDonagh sisters made a number of self-funded films together in the late 1920s and early 1930s.

Originally the film's length was 6000 feet plus, it survives at 6309 feet (94 mins. at 18 frame/s).

Plot summary
An embezzler, Bill Marsh (Arthur Greenaway), works with his daughter Paula (Marie Lorraine), who serves as a bait, robbing wealthy people. Bill also seeks revenge on a businessman, John Travers (John Faulkner), but Paula falls in love with Travers' son Lee (Josef Bambach) and begins to have doubts about her life of crime. Eventually Paula reforms and marries Lee.

Cast
Marie Lorraine (Isabel McDonagh) as Paula Marsh
Arthur Greenaway as Richard Marsh
John Faulkner as John Travers
Leal Douglas as the Lady
Josef Bambach as Lee Travers
Nellie McNiven as Mrs Hugh Nash
Elaine de Chair as Louise Nash
Frank Hawthorne as Keith Manion
Reg Quartly as Jan

Production
The film was shot as a silent movie in 1929 but had trouble securing a release. The McDonaghs decided to adapt it into a partial talkie and shot some additional scenes in Melbourne in 1930 using an improvised sound-on-disc system. These scenes included a fancy dress party sequence and a romantic scene where Paula sings a song to Lee.
 
The musician's union temporarily prevented its members from recording music for the film. The McDonaghs responded by hiring non-union labour.

Release
In May 1930 the film was entered in the first Commonwealth Film competition but failed to win a prize. It did not perform well at the box office due in part to the poor quality of its sound recording.

The critic from the Sydney Morning Herald was not enthusiastic about the movie's quality:
The Misses McDonagh's latest film... is not as interesting as their last production, The Far Paradise. For one thing, they have slavishly copied American models. Instead of striving to give their work originality, the Americanisms, "big boy", "dame", and '"gangster", creep into the captions. For The Cheaters is, through the greater part of its length, a silent film... the use of captions seem strained and artificial... The Cheaters suffers from a poor, badly-told story. Especially toward the end, absurdities spring up in battalions. The piece of dialogue that brings the picture to a close is an extreme example of bathos... The acting of the cast... is weak, and it goes at too slow a tempo, flying to the other extreme from the fault of jerky rapidity that used to mar local productions. The best feature of the film lies in its settings.

National Film and Sound Archive comments:
Filmed with a careful eye for detail on location in Sydney and at the McDonagh family home, Drummoyne House, the picture shows evidence of the McDonagh sisters' understanding of mood and atmosphere. This is one of Australia's major surviving silents. Completed as a silent in early 1929, the film was redone as a partial talkie because of distribution difficulties, and used sound on disc with some scenes re-shot. The film was redone again with an optical soundtrack on a Standardtone system.''

Notes

References

External links

The Cheaters at Oz Movies
"The Cheaters" (1929) Classic Australian Silent Crime Drama - three minute clip on Youtube.
 NFSA Restores THE CHEATERS (1929): Before and After - National Film and Sound Archive clip on Youtube.

1930 films
1930s English-language films
Australian silent feature films
1930s thriller films
Australian thriller films
Films directed by Paulette McDonagh
Australian black-and-white films
Silent thriller films